Hall Ridge is a low, snow-covered ridge  south of the Eland Mountains in Palmer Land, Antarctica. It was mapped by the United States Geological Survey in 1974, and was named by the Advisory Committee on Antarctic Names for Captain Phillip L. Hall, U.S. Army, an Assistant Civil Engineering Officer on the staff of the Commander, Naval Support Force, Antarctica, during Operation Deep Freeze, 1969 and 1970.

References

Ridges of Palmer Land